Argophyllum palumense is a plant in the Argophyllaceae family endemic to a small part of north eastern Queensland. It was described and named in 2018.

Taxonomy
This species was first described, along with a number of other new species in this genus, in 2018 by the Australian botanists Anthony Bean and Paul Forster who published it in the Journal Austrobaileya. The type specimen was collected in 2009 in the Mount Zero-Taravale Sanctuary by Forster.

Etymology
The genus name Argophyllum is derived from Ancient Greek Ἄργος (Árgos) meaning white or shining, and φύλλον (phúllon) meaning leaf. It refers to the white colouration of the underside of the leaves. The species epithet palumense refers to the location where this species is found.

Distribution and habitat
A. palumense is endemic to southern parts of the Wet Tropics of Queensland in mountainous terrain of the Paluma Range National Park, north east of Townsville.

Conservation
This species is listed by the Queensland Department of Environment and Science as least concern. , it has not been assessed by the IUCN.

References

External links
 View a map of recorded sightings of Argophyllum palumense at the Australasian Virtual Herbarium

Endemic flora of Australia
Flora of Queensland
Taxa named by Paul Irwin Forster
Taxa named by Anthony Bean
Argophyllaceae